Anne Lascaris (November 1487 – July 1554), countess of Tende and of Villars, was a French noblewoman. She was the daughter of Jean-Antoine II de Lascaris, comte de Tende and Ventimiglia, lord of Mentone, and his wife Isabeau (or Isabelle) d'Anglure-Estoges.

At 11 and a half years old, Anne married Louis de Clermont-Lodève, vicomte de Nébousan, then on 28 January 1501 she married René, le Grand Bâtard de Savoie 1468-1525), comte de Villars-en-Bresse, governor of Nice and Provence, admiral of France. With no male heirs, her father's properties and titles devolved on Anne at his death on 13 August 1509. Anne and René had the following children.

 Madeleine (c. 1510 - c. 1586), court official, married Anne de Montmorency
 Claude of Savoy (27 March 1507 – 23 April 1566), count of Tende
 Honorat II of Savoy (1509-20 September 1580), count of Villars, marshal of France in 1571, married Françoise de Foix
 Marguerite, wife of Antoine II Luxembourg-Ligny (died 1557), count of Brienne
 Isabeau, wife of René de Batarnay, count of Bouchage

In 1515, Lucien, Lord of Monaco bought the feudal rights over the city of Mentone, from the family of Anne Lascaris, thus bringing the city, as a whole, under Monaco's sovereignty until the French Revolution.

References

1487 births
1554 deaths
Anne
Court of Francis I of France